Yukiko Kato  is a Japanese writer. She is best known for writing , which won the 1982 Akutagawa Prize.

Biography 
Kato was born Yukiko Shiraki in Sapporo, Japan on September 26, 1936. Her father was a university professor from Tokyo; he and Kato's mother were in Sapporo for work. The family lived in Beijing from 1941 to 1947. They returned to Tokyo after World War II. Kato returned to Hokkaido to attend university, and graduated with an agriculture degree from Hokkaido University in 1959. After graduation she worked for the Ministry of Agriculture and Forestry and the Nature Conservation Society of Japan.

Kato began her writing career after leaving public service. Her first story was published in 1981. Some of her works, like Yume no Kabe, take inspiration from her time in Beijing at the end of World War II. Her short stories also reflect on the relationship between humans and nature.

Selected works

References 

Living people
1936 births
20th-century Japanese novelists
People from Sapporo
Hokkaido University alumni

Akutagawa Prize winners